Hermann Graedener or Grädener (8 May 1844 – 15 September 1929) was a German composer, conductor and teacher.

Biography
He was born in Kiel in the Duchy of Holstein. He was educated by his father, composer Karl Graedener. He then studied at the Vienna Conservatory. From 1862 he was organist at the Lutheran City Church in Vienna, and from 1864 violinist in the court's orchestra. He taught at the Vienna Conservatory from 1877 to 1913, being a professor from 1882. Between 1892 and 1896 he was director of the Wiener Singakademie. He died in Vienna.

His compositions, influenced by Johannes Brahms, include two symphonies, two violin concertos and two piano concertos.

He was the father of the writer Hermann Graedener.

See also
 Graedener

External links
Biography

1844 births
1929 deaths
19th-century classical composers
20th-century classical composers
Austrian classical composers
Composers from Vienna
Austrian conductors (music)
Male conductors (music)
Austrian classical organists
Austrian classical violinists
Male classical violinists
Musicians from Kiel